The New Zealand cricket team toured Zimbabwe between 2 and 9 August 2015. The tour consisted of three One Day International (ODI) matches and one Twenty20 International (T20I). For the first ODI, New Zealand played under the name of Aotearoa. This is the Māori name for New Zealand. The tour coincided with te Wiki o te Reo Māori (Māori Language Week).

In June Brendon McCullum was confirmed as the captain for New Zealand on this tour. However in July, it was announced that McCullum had been rested for this tour and the tour to South Africa, being replaced by Kane Williamson. New Zealand won the ODI series 2–1 and the T20I series 1–0.

Squads

New Zealand's Mitchell Santner was ruled out of the tour after fracturing his thumb. He was replaced by George Worker. Ross Taylor was injured in training the day before the 3rd ODI and was ruled out of the rest of the tour.

ODI series

1st ODI

2nd ODI

3rd ODI

T20I series

Only T20I

References

External links
 Series home at ESPN Cricinfo

2015 in New Zealand cricket
2015 in Zimbabwean cricket
International cricket competitions in 2015
New Zealand cricket tours of Zimbabwe